The 2022 Desert Cup T20I Series was a Twenty20 International (T20I) cricket tournament that took place in Oman in November 2022. The participating teams were the hosts Oman along with Bahrain, Canada and Saudi Arabia. The tournament was played as a double round-robin, with the top two sides advancing to the final. The T20I tournament was followed by a three-match 50-over series between Oman and Canada, as the Canadians prepared for the final event of the 2019–2022 ICC Cricket World Cup Challenge League in Malaysia in December 2022.

Canada finished top of the round-robin, with five wins from six games. They were joined in the final by Oman after Bahrain lost to Saudi Arabia in the last match. Canada comfortably defeated Oman in the final by 8 wickets, thanks to a century opening partnership in their run chase. Saudi Arabia beat Bahrain in the third-place play-off.

Squads

T20I series

Round-robin

Points table

 Advanced to the final
 Advanced to the 3rd place play-off

Fixtures

3rd place play-off

Final

50-over series

1st 50-over match

2nd 50-over match

3rd 50-over match

References

External links
 Series home at ESPNcricinfo (Desert Cup T20I series)
 Series home at ESPNcricinfo (Canada in Oman)

Associate international cricket competitions in 2022–23
International cricket competitions in Oman
Desert Cup